The German Emperor was the official title of the head of state and hereditary ruler of the German Empire. A specifically chosen term, it was introduced with the 1 January 1871 constitution and lasted until the official abdication of Wilhelm II on 9 November 1918. The Holy Roman Emperor is sometimes also called "German Emperor" when the historical context is clear, as derived from the Holy Roman Empire's official name of "Holy Roman Empire of the German Nation" from 1512.

Following the revolution of 1918, the head of state was the president of the Reich, beginning with Friedrich Ebert.

German Empire (1848–49)
In the wake of the revolutions of 1848 and during the German Empire (1848–49), King Frederick Wilhelm IV of Prussia was offered the title "Emperor of the Germans" by the Frankfurt Parliament in 1849, but declined it as "not the Parliament's to give". Frederick Wilhelm believed that only the German princes had the right to make such an offer, in accordance with the traditions of the Holy Roman Empire.

Creation

The title was carefully chosen by Otto von Bismarck, Minister President of Prussia and Chancellor of the North German Confederation, after discussion which continued until the proclamation of King Wilhelm I of Prussia as emperor at the Palace of Versailles during the Siege of Paris. Wilhelm accepted this title grudgingly on 18 January, having preferred "Emperor of Germany". However, that would have signaled a territorial sovereignty unacceptable to the South German monarchs, as well as a claim to lands outside his realm (Austria, Switzerland, Luxembourg, etc.).

"Emperor of the Germans", as had been proposed at the Frankfurt Parliament in 1849, was ruled out by Wilhelm as he considered himself a king who ruled by divine right and chosen "By the Grace of God", not by the people in a popular monarchy. But more in general, Wilhelm was unhappy about a crown that looked artificial (like Napoléon's), having been created by a constitution. He was afraid that it would overshadow the Prussian crown.

Since 1867, the presidency (Bundespräsidium) of the North German Confederation had been a hereditary office of the kings of Prussia. The new constitution of 1 January 1871, following Reichstag and Bundesrat decisions on 9/10 December, transformed the North German Confederation into the German Empire. This empire was a federal monarchy; the emperor was head of state and president of the federated monarchs (the kings of Bavaria, Württemberg, Saxony, the grand dukes of Baden, Mecklenburg-Schwerin, Hesse, among others, as well as the principalities, duchies and of the free cities of Hamburg, Lübeck and Bremen).

Under the imperial constitution, the empire was a federation of states under the permanent presidency of the king of Prussia. Thus, the imperial crown was directly tied to the Prussian crown—something Wilhelm II discovered in the aftermath of World War I. He erroneously believed that he ruled the empire in personal union with Prussia. With the war's end, he conceded that he could not remain emperor, but initially thought he could at least retain his Prussian crown. However, his last chancellor, Prince Max of Baden, knew this was legally impossible, and announced Wilhelm's abdication of both thrones on 9 November, two days before the Armistice. Realizing his situation was untenable, Wilhelm went into exile in the Netherlands later that night. It was not until 28 November that Wilhelm formally gave up all "rights to the crown of Prussia and to the rights to the German imperial crown connected therewith."

Full titles

The German Emperors had an extensive list of titles and claims that reflected the geographic expanse and diversity of the lands ruled by the House of Hohenzollern.

Wilhelm I
His Imperial and Royal Majesty Wilhelm I, By the Grace of God, German Emperor and King of Prussia; Margrave of Brandenburg, Burgrave of Nuremberg, Count of Hohenzollern; sovereign and supreme Duke of Silesia and of the County of Glatz; Grand Duke of the Lower Rhine and of Posen; Duke of Saxony, of Westphalia, of Angria, of Pomerania, Lunenburg, Holstein and Schleswig, of Magdeburg, of Bremen, of Guelders, Cleves, Jülich and Berg, Duke of the Wends and the Kassubes, of Crossen, Lauenburg and Mecklenburg; Landgrave of Hesse and Thuringia; Margrave of Upper and Lower Lusatia; Prince of Orange; Prince of Rügen, of East Friesland, of Paderborn and Pyrmont, of Halberstadt, Münster, Minden, Osnabrück, Hildesheim, of Verden, Cammin, Fulda, Nassau and Moers; Princely Count of Henneberg; Count of Mark, of Ravensberg, of Hohenstein, Tecklenburg and Lingen, of Mansfeld, Sigmaringen and Veringen; Lord of Frankfurt.

Frederick III
His Imperial and Royal Majesty Frederick III, By the Grace of God, German Emperor and King of Prussia, Margrave of Brandenburg, Burgrave of Nuremberg, Count of Hohenzollern, Duke of Silesia and of the County of Glatz, Grand Duke of the Lower Rhine and of Posen, Duke of Saxony, of Angria, of Westphalia, of Pomerania and of Lunenburg, Duke of Schleswig, of Holstein and of Crossen, Duke of Magdeburg, of Bremen, of Guelderland and of Jülich, Cleves and Berg, Duke of the Wends and the Kashubians, of Lauenburg and of Mecklenburg, Landgrave of Hesse and in Thuringia, Margrave of Upper and Lower Lusatia, Prince of Orange, of Rugen, of East Friesland, of Paderborn and of Pyrmont, Prince of Halberstadt, of Münster, of Minden, of Osnabrück, of Hildesheim, of Verden, of Kammin, of Fulda, of Nassau and of Moers, Princely Count of Henneberg, Count of the Mark, of Ravensberg, of Hohenstein, of Tecklenburg and of Lingen, Count of Mansfeld, of Sigmaringen and of Veringen, Lord of Frankfurt.

Wilhelm II
His Imperial and Royal Majesty Wilhelm II, By the Grace of God, German Emperor and King of Prussia, Margrave of Brandenburg, Burgrave of Nuremberg, Count of Hohenzollern, Duke of Silesia and of the County of Glatz, Grand Duke of the Lower Rhine and of Posen, Duke of Saxony, of Angria, of Westphalia, of Pomerania and of Lunenburg, Duke of Schleswig, of Holstein and of Crossen, Duke of Magdeburg, of Bremen, of Guelderland and of Jülich, Cleves and Berg, Duke of the Wends and the Kashubians, of Lauenburg and of Mecklenburg, Landgrave of Hesse and in Thuringia, Margrave of Upper and Lower Lusatia, Prince of Orange, of Rugen, of East Friesland, of Paderborn and of Pyrmont, Prince of Halberstadt, of Münster, of Minden, of Osnabrück, of Hildesheim, of Verden, of Kammin, of Fulda, of Nassau and of Moers, Princely Count of Henneberg, Count of the Mark, of Ravensberg, of Hohenstein, of Tecklenburg and of Lingen, Count of Mansfeld, of Sigmaringen and of Veringen, Lord of Frankfurt.

German Emperors (1871–1918)

See also
Crown of Wilhelm II
German State Crown
History of Germany
Holy Roman Emperor
List of German monarchs
List of monarchs of Prussia
Family tree of the German monarchs
Year of the Three Emperors

References

Citations

Bibliography

.
.

External links
House of Hohenzollern

 
Monarchy in Germany